Agustín Remiro (August 28, 1904 – June 21, 1942) was a Spanish anarchist and military leader.

References

Further reading 

 

1904 births
1942 deaths
Spanish anarchists
Executed anarchists
People executed by Francoist Spain